Dumfries and Galloway may refer to:

 Dumfries and Galloway, one of 32 unitary council areas of Scotland, located in the western Southern Uplands
 Dumfries and Galloway (UK Parliament constituency), a county constituency of the House of Commons of the Parliament of the United Kingdom first used in the 2005 general election